4-Mercapto-4-methyl-2-pentanone is an aroma compound with the chemical formula C6H12OS . It has a tropical flavor.  It is found in Sauvignon wines  and is a potent odorant of new-world hops.

References 

Ketones
Thiols